The 2018 Coastal Carolina Chanticleers baseball team represents the Coastal Carolina University in the 2018 NCAA Division I baseball season. The Chanticleers play their home games at Springs Brooks Stadium.

Schedule and results
 The 2018 schedule consists of 35 home and 21 away games in the regular season.  The Chanticleers will host Virginia Tech, Oklahoma, Kansas State, Indiana, VCU, UNCW, West Virginia, UNC, and Clemson for out of conference games.  They will also host conference opponents Texas State, South Alabama, Georgia State, ULM, and UA-Little Rock.

Rankings

References

Coastal Carolina
Coastal Carolina Chanticleers baseball seasons
Coastal Carolina